Jerry Shively is an American politician and educator who served as a member of the Idaho House of Representatives for the 33rd district from 2008 to 2010. After serving for one term, Shively was defeated by Republican Jeff Thompson.

Education 
Shively earned a Bachelor of Arts degree and Master of Education in music education from the University of Idaho.

Career 
Prior to entering politics, Shively worked as a music teacher at Idaho Falls High School. He later became music coordinator of the Idaho Falls School System before retiring. Shively has worked as a member of the staff of St. Paul's United Methodist Church in Idaho Falls, Idaho.

References 

Living people
University of Idaho alumni
Educators from Idaho
People from Idaho Falls, Idaho
Democratic Party members of the Idaho House of Representatives
Year of birth missing (living people)